Tough Guys is a 1986 American action comedy film directed by Jeff Kanew and starring Burt Lancaster, Kirk Douglas, Eli Wallach, Charles Durning, Dana Carvey and Darlanne Fluegel. It is the eighth film of Touchstone Pictures, and the final film to be released from Douglas' Bryna Productions.

Lancaster and Douglas had already made several films together, including I Walk Alone (1948), Gunfight at the O.K. Corral (1957), The Devil's Disciple (1959), and Seven Days in May (1964), becoming something of a team in the public's eye.  Douglas was always second-billed under Lancaster but, with the exception of I Walk Alone, in which Douglas played a villain, their roles were more or less of equal importance. Tough Guys was their final collaboration.

Adolph Caesar, who was originally going to star as Leon B. Little, died of complications from a heart attack on the set of the film and was replaced by Eli Wallach.

This was the first film released under the Touchstone Pictures name following its rebranding by Walt Disney Studios, after the release of Ruthless People (1986).

Plot 

Gangsters Harry Doyle and Archie Long are released from prison after having served a 30-year sentence for hijacking the Southern Pacific train the Gold Coast Flyer in 1956. Their parole officer Richie Evans meets them at the gates, offering them a ride to collect their Social Security. Meanwhile Leon B. Little, an elderly hitman with bad eyesight and an outstanding contract on them, immediately tries to kill them but Harry and Archie get away.

At the bank, the duo stop a robbery taking down the two young armed gunmen. Then, they trash six young street punks trying to rob them. Richie informs them of their parole conditions. Harry, at 72, is committed to a retirement community; despite wanting to work, he is past the mandatory retirement age of 70. Archie, only 67, takes a job first at an ice cream parlor and later a restaurant. They cannot have further contact with each other for at least three years, and are closely monitored by Richie and Deke Yablonski, the officer who first arrested them.

Both Harry and Archie are in shock at how much the world has changed: clothing, sexuality (their old bar is now an openly gay men's club, women are more assertive), technology, and disrespect from youth. Archie's young female restaurant manager mistreats him, while Harry is denied proper food by a nasty retirement home orderly and the female manager is even nastier. Harry reconnects with his old flame Belle, and they sweetly reminisce about old times. 

Archie embraces the much changed contemporary scene and at a unisex high-tech gym, the young manager Skye decides he is the only "real man" there. She gets Archie to adopt faddish clothes and invites him to a trendy disco nightclub, they gyrate to new wave music, and start a steamy affair which aging Archie cannot sustain.

Tired of trying to adjust to 1980s society under the eyes of the law, Harry and Archie go back to their old ways. First, trying to reassemble their old gang for a bank robbery, all surviving members are now either crippled or invalids. When they hijack an armored truck, they find it empty except for a roll of quarters, and are mocked by the media. To add insult to injury, they are mistaken for younger, disguised men. 

Meanwhile, Leon tracks Richie down at his office and finds Harry's retirement home. He holds him and Belle hostage until Harry and Archie arrive and opens fire. Richie knocks Leon down and quickly escapes with them, then blames himself for getting them into trouble. 

Archie decides to hijack the Gold Coast Flyer again as it makes its final southbound run after 50 years, asking Harry and Richie for help. Both refuse for moral reasons, so Archie decides to do it alone. He stops the Flyer just as it is leaving the railroad yard and is soon joined by Harry, having had a change of heart. 

The media and dignitaries aboard are surprised, although Harry and Archie gladly answer their questions and pose for pictures as they identify themselves and their ages. To their surprise, Leon arrives and explains that he had been paid $25,000 to kill them by their old enemy and he has waited 30 years for their release. 

Deke soon arrives with a full SWAT team to capture Harry and Archie, who persuade Leon to call a temporary truce as they have never killed anyone in their crimes. As Leon escorts the passengers off the train, Richie, disguised as a SWAT officer, sneaks aboard and gets it moving again to help Harry and Archie escape before Deke can arrest them.

Harry, Archie, Richie, and Leon take the train towards Mexico, but find that the tracks end just before the border. Harry pushes Leon off the train, to which he vows revenge. Archie then takes Richie back to the coaches and uncouples the train, advising he downplay his role in the heist to not destroy his career. Harry and Archie drive the locomotive at full throttle through a fusillade of bullets from U.S. border police. They crash through, burying the engine partially in the soil of Mexico a few feet across the border, where a Mexican border patrol arrests them. 

True to their tough guy credo, Harry and Archie raise their hands but talk back to the patrol's commanding officer, leaving him puzzled enough to gives Archie an opening to kick him in the groin.

Cast 
 Burt Lancaster as Harold 'Harry' Doyle
 Kirk Douglas as Archibald 'Archie' Long
 Charles Durning as Sergeant Deke Yablonski
 Alexis Smith as Belle
 Dana Carvey as Richard 'Richie' Evans
 Darlanne Fluegel as Skye
 Eli Wallach as Leon B. Little
 Monty Ash as Vince
 Billy Barty as Philly
 Simmy Bow as Schultz
 Darlene Conley as Gladys Ripps
 Nathan Davis as Jimmy Ellis
 Grant Aleksander as Bartender At Mickey's Bar
 Red Hot Chili Peppers as Themselves
 Hilary Shepard as Sandy

Soundtrack 
Kenny Rogers sings the opening theme song "They Don't Make Them Like They Used To".

Janet Jackson sings the song, "Nasty," during Harry and Archie's lesson in Street Fighting with a local street gang.

The Red Hot Chili Peppers briefly appear in the film where they performed a song never heard outside this film: "Set It Straight". No soundtrack album was released, and frontman Anthony Kiedis was quoted as saying they recorded it solely for the movie and had no intention of releasing it themselves.

The 1977 Bing Crosby recording of Duke Ellington's "Don't Get Around Much Anymore" is featured.

The Fabulous Thunderbirds song "Tuff Enuff" plays in the armored truck hijacking scene on the truck's radio and during the ending credits.

Production 
The film began filming with Adolph Cesar in the role of Leon B. Little, but the actor suffered a stroke only a few weeks in and the scenes had to be re-shot with his replacement Eli Wallach.

The locomotive Southern Pacific 4449 played the Gold Coast Flyer. It was also used to pull the American Freedom Train exhibit during the Bicentennial, now based in Portland, Oregon.

The locomotive engineer is played by Doyle L. McCormack, the man most responsible for the actual restoration of SP 4449. A portion of the Eagle Mountain Railroad was used in the filming of the movie.

During the filming of the exterior shots of SP 4449, the train was stored nightly at the Eagle Mountain rail yards. The local school children from Eagle Mountain School took a field trip in early 1986 to see and tour the train on location along the Eagle Mountain Railroad south of Interstate 10.

As of November 2, 2019, the full size replica prop, which was used at the end of the film, was sold at an Auction to a student at Desert Center, California.

Reception

Box office 
The film was released in theaters on October 3, 1986 in the United States, it opened up on its first weekend making US$4.5 million and would eventually make $21,458,229 in total worldwide.

Critical response 
Tough Guys received mixed reviews from critics. On Rotten Tomatoes it has an approval rating of 53% based on 15 reviews. On Metacritic, the film has a weighted average score of 54 out of 100, based on eleven critics, indicating "Mixed or average reviews".

Walter Goodman of The New York Times gave the film a positive review, saying, “We know that when the he-men of “Gunfight at the O.K. Corral” are picked on by a bunch of callow toughs, the toughs are going to regret they started up. But it's fun anyhow waiting for what it is.” Roger Ebert gave the film a two out of four stars, stating, "Watching Tough Guys, you begin to meditate. You look at Kirk Douglas and Burt Lancaster, and you remember years and years of moviegoing, Tough Guys might have been better if Douglas and Lancaster had played characters who were a little more fallible, humble and realistic".

See also 
 Going in Style
 Stand Up Guys
 Going in Style (2017 film)

References

External links 

 
 
 
 
 
 Movie stills

1986 films
1980s action comedy films
American crime comedy films
Films about old age
Films directed by Jeff Kanew
Films scored by James Newton Howard
Films set in Los Angeles
Films shot in Los Angeles
Rail transport films
Touchstone Pictures films
Bryna Productions films
Films set in 1986
1986 comedy films
1980s English-language films
1980s American films